The Music Jungle was an Australian music television show that was broadcast on the Nine Network on Saturday mornings between 11am and 12pm.

The 2007 season began on 31 March and ended on 8 December. The 2008 season began on 22 March. The Music Jungle last aired in March 2009.

Program format 
The Music Jungle generally played Top 40 Australian and overseas music clips.

The show was produced by Headlock Media, the Television and Content Creation Division of Sony Music Australia.

Presenters 
The initial host was Asha Kuerten in 2007. In 2008, Angela Johnson of The Mint replaced Asha Kuerten as host. On 14 June 2008, former host of Eclipse Music TV and Famous Uncensored Lizzy Lovette replaced Angela Johnson.

See also

 List of Australian music television shows

Nine Network original programming
Australian music television series
2007 Australian television series debuts
2009 Australian television series endings